Patrick Chan may refer to:
Patrick Chan (born 1990), Canadian figure skater
Patrick Chan (judge) (born 1948), Hong Kong judge
Patrick Peter Chan, Canadian computer scientist

See also
Patrick Chung (born 1987), American football player